Kevin Moore (born 30 November 1965) is an Australian former rugby league football coach and player.

Playing career
He played for the Halifax team in the Championship (1984–1986). He then joined the Canterbury Bulldogs team in 1989, where he remained until 1994.

Coaching career
Moore became the head coach for the Canterbury-Bankstown Bulldogs of the NRL from the 2009 season and was named in place of Steve Folkes after his retirement. He led the club to a second-place finish in 2009 and guided them all the way to the preliminary final before they were defeated by arch rivals the Parramatta Eels in front of a record non-grand final crowd of 74,549.  Canterbury had gone into the game as favorites despite Parramatta's dream run at the back end of the season.

Moore was sacked midway through the 2011 season after the club underachieved in the ensuing two years, failing to make the finals in either 2010 or 2011.

Personal life
He is the son of Peter "Bullfrog" Moore. He is also brother-in-law to his predecessor, former Bulldogs coach Steve Folkes.

References

External links
Bulldogs profile

1965 births
Living people
Australian rugby league coaches
Australian rugby league players
Canterbury-Bankstown Bulldogs coaches
Canterbury-Bankstown Bulldogs players
Halifax R.L.F.C. players
Hughes family
Rugby league halfbacks
Rugby league players from Sydney